Type 22 class may refer to:

 Type 22 frigate, a Royal Navy frigate class
 Type 022 missile boat, a People's Liberation Army Navy fast attack craft